The Ormonde Apartment Building is a building located in northwest Portland, Oregon listed on the National Register of Historic Places.

See also
 National Register of Historic Places listings in Northwest Portland, Oregon

References

1907 establishments in Oregon
Colonial Revival architecture in Oregon
Residential buildings completed in 1907
Apartment buildings on the National Register of Historic Places in Portland, Oregon
Northwest Portland, Oregon